Lütken is a surname. Notable people with the surname include:

 Anne Marie Lütken (1916–2001), Danish painter
 Christian Frederik Lütken (1827–1901), Danish naturalist. The standard author abbreviation Lütken is used to indicate this person
 Frances Lütken (born 1950), British cross-country skier
 Julie Lütken (1788–1816), Danish painter
 Per Lütken (1916–1998), Danish glassmaker

Danish-language surnames